In low-dimensional topology, the trigenus of a closed 3-manifold is an invariant consisting of an ordered triple .  It is obtained by minimizing the genera of three orientable handle bodies — with no intersection between their interiors— which decompose the manifold as far as the Heegaard genus need only two.

That is, a decomposition  with

For orientable spaces,
where  is 's Heegaard genus.

For non-orientable spaces the   has the form  
depending on the
image of the first Stiefel–Whitney characteristic class  under a Bockstein homomorphism, respectively for

If  then , and if 
then .

Theorem
A manifold S is a Stiefel–Whitney surface in M, if and only if  S and M−int(N(S)) are orientable.

References
J.C. Gómez Larrañaga, W. Heil, V.M. Núñez. Stiefel–Whitney surfaces and decompositions of 3-manifolds into handlebodies, Topology Appl. 60 (1994), 267–280.
J.C. Gómez Larrañaga, W. Heil, V.M. Núñez. Stiefel–Whitney surfaces and the trigenus  of non-orientable 3-manifolds, Manuscripta Math. 100 (1999), 405–422.
"On the trigenus of surface bundles over ", 2005, Soc. Mat. Mex. | pdf

Geometric topology
3-manifolds